The Big Ten Conference Freshman of the Year is an annual college baseball award presented to the Big Ten Conference's most outstanding freshman player. The award was first given following the 1988 season to Dan Wilson of Minnesota.

Key

Winners

Winners by school

Notes
 Wisconsin discontinued its baseball program after the 1991 season.

References

Awards established in 1988
Freshman
NCAA Division I baseball conference freshmen of the year